Gioura, sometimes romanized as Youra, is a Greek island and abandoned settlement in the eastern part of the Northern Sporades. It is administratively part of the municipality of Alonnisos. The island name comes from the ancient Greek Gerontia. The 1991 census counted one inhabitant making it the smallest municipal district in Greece in population. , it had no resident population. Gioura is in Zone A of the Alonnisos Marine Park.

The Cyclops Cave is the largest cave in the Sporades, and an archaeological site dating from the Mesolithic through the Late Neolithic periods.

Nearest islands and islets
Its nearest islands and islets are Pelagos/ Kyra Panagia to the west, Psathoura to the north and Piperi to the east.

References

External links
Gioura on GTP Travel Pages 

Landforms of the Sporades
Uninhabited islands of Greece
Islands of Thessaly